A sea eagle or fish eagle (also called erne or ern, mostly in reference to the white-tailed eagle) is any of the birds of prey in the genus Haliaeetus in the bird of prey family Accipitridae.

Taxonomy and evolution
The genus Haliaeetus was introduced in 1809 by French naturalist Marie Jules César Savigny in his chapter on birds in the Description de l'Égypte. The two fish eagles in the genus Ichthyophaga were found to lie within Haliaeetus in a genetic study in 2005, they were then moved accordingly. They are very similar to the tropical Haliaeetus species. A prehistoric (i.e. extinct before 1500) form from Maui in the Hawaiian Islands may represent a species or subspecies in this genus.

The relationships to other genera in the family are less clear; they have long been considered closer to the genus Milvus (kites) than to the true eagles in the genus Aquila on the basis of their morphology and display behaviour; more recent genetic evidence agrees with this, but points to their being related to the genus Buteo (buzzards/hawks), as well, a relationship not previously thought close.

A 2005 molecular study found that the genus is paraphyletic and subsumes Ichthyophaga, the species diverging into a temperate and tropical group.

Evolution
Haliaeetus is possibly one of the oldest genera of living birds. A distal left tarsometatarsus (DPC 1652) recovered from early Oligocene deposits of Fayyum, Egypt (Jebel Qatrani Formation, about 33 million years ago (Mya)) is similar in general pattern and some details to that of a modern sea eagle. The genus was present in the middle Miocene (12-16 Mya) with certainty.

The origin of the sea eagles and fishing eagles is probably in the general area of the Bay of Bengal. During the Eocene/Oligocene, as the Indian subcontinent slowly collided with Eurasia, this was a vast expanse of fairly shallow ocean; the initial sea eagle divergence seems to have resulted in the four tropical (and Southern Hemisphere subtropical) species living around the Indian Ocean today. The Central Asian Pallas's sea eagle's relationships to the other taxa is more obscure; it seems closer to the three Holarctic species which evolved later and may be an early offshoot of this northward expansion; it does not have the hefty yellow bill of the northern forms, retaining a smaller, darker beak like the tropical species.

The rate of molecular evolution in Haliaeetus is fairly slow, as is to be expected in long-lived birds which take years to successfully reproduce. In the mtDNA cytochrome b gene, a mutation rate of 0.5–0.7% per million years (if assuming an Early Miocene divergence) or maybe as little as 0.25–0.3% per million years (for a Late Eocene divergence) has been shown.

Species 
The 10 extant species are:

Description
There are exceptional records of even heavier individuals in both the white-tailed and bald eagles, although not surpassing the largest Steller's sea eagles. They are generally overall brown (from rich brown to dull grey-brown), often with white to the head, tail or underparts. Some of the species have an all-yellow beak as adults, which is unusual among eagles.

Their diets consist mainly of fish, aquatic birds, and small mammals. Nests are typically very large and positioned in a tree, but sometimes on a cliff.

The tail is entirely white in adult Haliaeetus species except for Sanford's, white-bellied, and Pallas's. Three species pairs exist: white-tailed and bald eagles, Sanford's and white-bellied sea eagles, and the African and Madagascar fish eagles, each of these consists of a white- and a tan-headed species.

In popular culture

 The bald eagle is the national symbol of the United States.
 The silver eagle on red shield on the arms of Poland has been interpreted as the sea eagle.
 Namibia, Zambia, and Zimbabwe have the African fish eagle as their national bird.
 The white-tailed eagle is the national bird of Poland.
 The Manly Warringah Sea Eagles are an Australian professional rugby league club that competes in the National Rugby League (NRL).
 Nesting pairs of both the bald eagle and white-bellied sea eagle have been subject to live-streaming webcam footage.
 In heraldic language, the osprey is termed a "sea-eagle", although ospreys come from the taxonomic family Pandionidae and are not classified as true sea eagles.

See also
 Brahminy kite, also called red-backed sea eagle
Osprey

References

General sources

External links 
 

Eagles